Chang Sung-hwan (Korean: 장성환; Hanja: 張盛煥, October 27, 1920 – January 4, 2015) was a South Korean air force lieutenant general, government minister and diplomat. He was the first Korean pilot to fly the North American P-51 Mustang during the Korean War. He was Chief of Staff of the Republic of Korea Air Force from 1962 to 1964. Upon his retirement from the military, he served as ambassador to Thailand, transportation minister, and president of the Korea Trade Promotion Corporation (KOTRA).

Death
Chang died in January 2015 of natural causes. He was 94.

References 

1920 births
2015 deaths
Chiefs of Staff of the Air Force (South Korea)
South Korean military personnel of the Korean War
Government ministers of South Korea
Ambassadors of South Korea to Thailand
Place of birth missing